The Waverly School (often called simply Waverly) is a nonsectarian, coeducational, college preparatory, progressive day school in Pasadena, California, United States for students in preschool through high school. It has three campuses, and a one-acre organic farm within walking distance. It is an independent school.

Accreditation
The school is fully accredited by the Western Association of Schools and Colleges and the California Association of Independent Schools, and is a member of The Independent School Alliance, POCIS and A Better Chance.

Preschool
Waverly's preschool program focuses on experiential learning, play, and social-emotional growth, consistent with developmentally appropriate practice. Each school year, the preschool teaching team develops a theme, within which children explore concepts of science, math, the arts, and language. As the teachers learn the children's needs and interests, they adjust their plans, allowing children to be co-constructors of the curriculum. The children learn to identify their emotions, express themselves in appropriate ways, and understand the perspectives and feelings of others. Time outdoors in unstructured but supported play is an essential part of early childhood education; Waverly preschoolers spend about half of the day outside. The preschool's emphasis on learning through play and supporting children's social-emotional development provides them with a solid foundation as they enter elementary school.

Waverly's preschool program, licensed by the California Department of Social Services, is designed for children from 3 1/2 to 5; younger children usually attend the preschool for two years. It is limited to 17 students. It is held on the elementary school campus at 67 W. Bellevue Drive.

Elementary school
Students learn from their life experiences, in developmental stages, and through activities. Each elementary teaching team develops a social studies theme for the school year and builds an interdisciplinary curriculum around that theme, incorporating language arts, math, science, the arts, and community service. Many of the skills needed to be successful in the academic disciplines intersect; the fluid nature of a theme-driven curriculum gives teachers the flexibility to teach and reinforce these skills across the curriculum. This structure also allows students to learn through experiential lessons and multi-modal approaches that help students of all developmental levels and learning styles access the content and develop a firm foundation in critical thinking, reasoning, and analysis. Teachers take a child-centered approach, often using children's own interests and experiences as a starting point for designing and teaching lessons.

Kindergarten through 6th grade classes are in self-contained classrooms with a lead and an associate teacher. The average class size is 24 students, maintaining a 12:1 or lower student-teacher ratio. Beginning in first grade, most classes are multi-age in dual-grade configurations (e.g., 1st/2nd, 3rd/4th, and 5th/6th). There is a range of ages and developmental levels in each class.

The elementary school is located at 67 W. Bellevue Drive, Pasadena, California.

Middle school
Waverly's middle school program is built on the belief that students in 7th and 8th grade require a unique approach to their education. Students work with five core educators who teach multiple subjects throughout the school day and are readily available to students. This approach meets the academic demands of middle school while supporting the personal growth of the students.

In alternating years of the multidisciplinary program, teachers integrate study of American and world themes in the English and history classes. Science classes follow an intensive, hands-on curriculum designed to prepare students for a demanding laboratory science program in high school. The math program offers different classes suited to each student's ability. Advanced students are able to take Algebra I and Geometry for high school credit in 8th grade. Spanish is a core subject at the middle school; 8th grade students may earn high school credit and move on to Spanish II their freshman year.

Teachers integrate issues that students face into class discussion, choice of novels, and texts. Writing assignments ask students to reflect, analyze, make ethical choices, understand other perspectives, and address personal goals and choices they have made. Teachers often refer to current events so that students make connections between what they are studying and what is happening in the world around them.

A significant goal of the middle school is to prepare students for the academic challenges of high school. The program emphasizes the development of strong and consistent work habits and solid skills in writing, mathematics, and analytical and critical thinking.

The middle school is located at 120 Waverly Drive, Pasadena, California.

High school
Waverly's high school offers college preparatory program. Students thrive in an environment that values inquiry, debate, and critical thinking, and teachers work closely with students to help them develop these skills in all subject areas. When choosing novels, designing projects, and creating lessons, teachers ensure that students learn from a wide range of backgrounds, voices, and perspectives. Writing assignments call on students to reflect, analyze, make ethical choices, understand others' perspectives, and address personal goals and choices. Teachers often refer to current events so students will make connections between what they are studying and what is happening in the world around them. A low student-teacher ratio and an accessible faculty facilitate supportive relationships, essential for academic success during adolescence.

Waverly's minimum graduation requirements exceed the entrance requirements for the University of California. The school offers a wide range of courses, all approved by the University of California, including Advanced Placement and Honors courses. Waverly emphasizes essential academic and social-emotional skills that produce students well prepared for the academic demands of college and beyond.

The high school is located on the Dean A. and Janice E. Scarborough Campus (108 Waverly Drive, Pasadena, California), a facility consisting of refurbished houses built before 1940. The Pasadena Historical Society helped to fund the moving of three buildings from their original site so that the buildings could be preserved and put to use.

Waverly is registered with the California Interscholastic Federation.

Organic farm
Located at 665 South Pasadena Avenue, Pasadena, California (in walking distance from the school), the school's one-acre organic farm is an outdoor classroom, not necessarily related to farming. Teachers take their classes to the farm to write, observe wildlife, and conduct science experiments. A plot for each classroom is available if desired by the teacher.

The organic farm exists to allow students, their families, their teachers, and the broader community to engage nature on multiple levels. The scope of participation in the life of the farm ranges from active cultivation and organic production to inventive play, hands-on learning, and appreciation of nature. The farm also creates opportunities for elementary, middle, and high school students to interact in ways that nurture cross-generational mentoring, leadership skills, and social harmony. The intent is that the farm be inspirational, experimental, educational, and sustainable.

References

External links

California Association of Independent Schools
California Interscholastic Federation
The Alliance
POCIS

Private elementary schools in California
Private middle schools in California
High schools in Los Angeles County, California
Private high schools in California
Private preparatory schools in California
1993 establishments in California